Babordsranten Ridge is a small ridge  south of Stamnen Peak, at the southwest end of Ahlmann Ridge in Queen Maud Land. It was mapped by Norwegian cartographers from surveys and from air photos by the Norwegian-British-Swedish Antarctic Expedition (1949–52) and named "Babordsranten" (the "port side ridge").

References 

Ridges of Queen Maud Land
Princess Martha Coast